Alfredo Espiga Rovira (11 October 1923 – 22 August 1951) was a Spanish footballer who played as a midfielder.

Born in Badalona, Catalonia, he played for CE Sabadell FC. He made his professional debut on 21 September 1947 in the first game of the La Liga season, a 2–2 home draw against neighbours Gimnàstic de Tarragona. He totalled 21 appearances that season, and 20 in the following campaign which ended in relegation. In all, Espiga played 89 games for the Arlequinats, including all ten of their promotion play-off games in 1950–51.

On their pre-season tour of the Netherlands, he was killed at the age of 27 when the car he was driven in collided with a tree near Maastricht; the three others in the car, amongst them two Spanish consular staff, were injured.

References

External links
 

1923 births
1951 deaths
People from Badalona
Sportspeople from the Province of Barcelona
Footballers from Catalonia
Spanish footballers
Association football midfielders
CE Sabadell FC footballers
La Liga players
Segunda División players
Road incident deaths in the Netherlands